Yamauchi or Yamanouchi (やまうち or やまのうち, lit. "inside mountains") is a Japanese surname. Either name is written in kanji as 山内 while Yamanouchi can also be written as 山ノ内.

Notable people with the surname include:

Yamanouchi Toyoshige, 15th feudal lord of the Tosa domain
Yamauchi Kazutoyo, first feudal lord of the Tosa domain
Kenji Yamanouchi, eponymous founder of Yamanouchi Pharmaceutical Co., now part of Astellas Pharma
Edwin M. Yamauchi, historian and biblical scholar
Fusajiro Yamauchi, founder of Nintendo
Sekiryo Yamauchi (born Sekiryo Kaneda), second president of Nintendo, son-in-law of Fusajiro Yamauchi
Hiroshi Yamauchi, third president of Nintendo, grandson of Fusajiro Yamauchi
Goiti Yamauchi, Japanese-Brazilian mixed martial artist
Kazunori Yamauchi, creator of the Gran Turismo videogame series
Mara Yamauchi, British long-distance runner
, Japanese rower
, Japanese long-distance runner
Wakako Yamauchi, American writer
Tetsu Yamauchi, Japanese bass guitarist for the bands Free and The Faces
Akihiro Yamauchi, Japanese volleyball player

Other uses:
Yamanouchi, Kamakura, a neighbourhood in Kanagawa Prefecture, Japan 
Yamanouchi, Nagano, a town in the Shimotakai District, Nagano Prefecture, Japan 
Yamauchi, Saga, a former town of Kishima District, Saga Prefecture, Japan
Yamanouchi Pharmaceutical, a company acquired by Astellas Pharma

See also
 Japanese name
 Special:Prefixindex/Yamauchi - the page gives articles starting with Yamauchi.
 Special:Prefixindex/Yamanouchi - the page gives articles starting with Yamanouchi.

Japanese-language surnames